Shrimper Records is an independent record label based in Upland, California. It was founded in 1990 by Dennis Callaci.

Roster

 Ah Bus
 Amps for Christ
 The Aum Rifle
 Azuza Plane
 The Babies
 Lou Barlow
 Bingo Trappers
 Franklin Bruno
 Bugskull
 Joey Burns (later of Calexico)
 The Bux
 Buzzsaw
 Carne-A
 John Davis
 The Debts
 Diskothi-Q
 The Extra Glenns
 Jad Fair
 Fishstick
 The Folk Implosion
 God Is My Co-Pilot
 Goosewind
 Guffey
 Halo
 Herman Dune
 Insect Feelings
 Irving Klaw Trio
 Jim Bishop Guitar Army
 Jive
 Joy
 Simon Joyner
 Junket
 Lil' Johnny H
 Adam Lipman
 Massengil
 The Mountain Goats
 Nothing Painted Blue
 Party of One
 Paste
 Primordial Undermind
 Punk Rock
 Refrigerator
 Satnam Puppets
 The Secret Stars
 Shoeface
 Will Simmons
 Sentridoh
 Soul-Junk
 Wckr Spgt
 Simon Wickham Smith
 Woods

References

External links
Unofficial discography
 

American independent record labels
Record labels established in 1990
Alternative rock record labels